Charleroi Locks & Dam, officially known as Locks & Dam 4 by the US Army Corps of Engineers, is one of nine navigational structures on the Monongahela River between Pittsburgh, Pennsylvania and Fairmont, West Virginia. Maintained and built by the U.S. Army Corps of Engineers, the gated dam forms an upstream pool that is for 19.7 miles to the Maxwell Lock & Dam.

The dam is located at mile 41.5 on the river. Unlike many of the river's single lock structure, the Charleroi facility features two working locks; this addition took place during a 1967 rehabilitation project.

See also
List of crossings of the Monongahela River

References

Buildings and structures in Washington County, Pennsylvania
Buildings and structures in Westmoreland County, Pennsylvania
Crossings of the Monongahela River
United States Army Corps of Engineers, Pittsburgh District
Dams in Pennsylvania
Locks of Pennsylvania
United States Army Corps of Engineers dams
Dams completed in 1932
Transportation buildings and structures in Washington County, Pennsylvania
Transportation buildings and structures in Westmoreland County, Pennsylvania
1932 establishments in Pennsylvania